Hubert Delanie Walker (born August 12, 1984) is an American former professional football player who was a tight end in the National Football League (NFL). He played college football at the Central Missouri State and was drafted by the San Francisco 49ers in the sixth round of the 2006 NFL Draft.

After seven seasons with the 49ers, Walker then played another seven seasons for the Tennessee Titans, with whom he had the most success and was a three-time Pro Bowl selection. Walker was released from the Titans after the 2019 season after missing 25 regular-season games over the last two seasons due to an ankle injury.

Early life
Walker attended and played high school football at Pomona High School. He was a first-team All-Region selection by The Times, adding All-Division and All-San Gabriel Valley honors as a senior under the direction of head coach John Capraro. He was twice chosen Miramonte League Offensive Player of the Year and was selected 2001 Pomona Red Devil of the Year. He played in the East/West All-Star game and also excelled in track & field, winning the Division III 100-meters title after also finishing first in the 2002 Miramonte League Meet.

After high school, Walker originally committed to UTEP, but decided to attend Mt. San Antonio College in Walnut, California to improve his academics.

College career
Walker first enrolled at Mt. San Antonio College. In 2003, he was ranked seventh on JCFootball.com's "Top 101 Players" list. Walker finished his junior college career with 86 catches for 1,312 yards and 13 touchdowns. He then transferred to the University of Central Missouri.

While at Central Missouri, Walker set or equaled several receiving records. In two seasons at Central Missouri, he caught 113 passes for 1,347 yards and 10 touchdowns to go along with 35 career kickoff returns for 965 yards and three touchdowns. Walker’s three kickoff returns for touchdowns are tied for the Central Missouri school record. In college, he majored in video production, with a minor in criminal justice at Central Missouri. On February 14, 2015, Walker was inducted into the Central Missouri Athletic Hall of Fame.

Professional career

San Francisco 49ers

2006 season: Rookie year

Walker was drafted by San Francisco 49ers in the sixth round with the 175th overall pick in the 2006 NFL Draft. He finished his rookie season with two receptions for 30 yards and had a 25-yard kickoff return in seven games and one start.

2007 season

During a Week 13 31-14 road loss to the Carolina Panthers, Walker caught his first NFL touchdown on a 21-yard pass from Trent Dilfer. In the next game against the Minnesota Vikings, Walker had his best game of the season, catching six passes for 66 yards as the 49ers lost by a score of 27-7.

Walker finished his second professional season with 21 receptions for 174 yards and a touchdown to go along with 63 return yards in 16 games and 10 starts.

2008 season

On June 22, 2008, the 49ers signed Walker to a three-year, $6 million extension through 2012. The deal included a $1.8 million signing bonus. During Week 4 of the preseason, Walker returned a kickoff for a 101-yard touchdown.

During a Week 3 31-13 victory over the Detroit Lions, Walker caught three passes for 44 yards and his first touchdown of the season.

Walker finished the 2008 season with 10 receptions for 155 yards and a touchdown to go along with 257 return yards in 15 games and two starts.

2009 season

In 2009, Walker recorded 21 receptions for 233 yards to go along with 85 return yards and 34 rushing yards in 16 games and eight starts as the 49ers finished with an 8–8 record.

2010 season

In 2010, Walker recorded 29 receptions for 331 yards to go along with 70 return yards and 18 rushing yards as the 49ers finished with a 6–10 record.

2011 season

In 2011, Jim Harbaugh became head coach of the 49ers, and Greg Roman became the offensive coordinator for the team. They praised Walker's skill set and used him in a number of different ways in the West Coast Offense, including different receiver spots, backup fullback, and even as an alternative kickoff returner and gunner on special teams, attributes that earned him the nickname of "The Swiss Army Knife" within the team.

Walker finished the season with 19 receptions for 198 yards and three touchdowns to go along with 28 return yards in 15 games and seven starts as the 49ers finished with a 13–3 record. In the postseason, Walker caught two passes for 36 yards before the 49ers lost to the eventual Super Bowl champions, the New York Giants in the NFC Championship.

2012 season

In 2012, Walker recorded 21 receptions for 344 yards and three touchdowns to go along with 28 return yards in 16 games and four starts as the 49ers finished with an 11–4–1 record. At the end of the season, Walker and 49ers reached Super Bowl XLVII. In the game, he had three receptions for 48 yards, but the 49ers fell behind early and could not come back, losing to the Baltimore Ravens by a score of 34–31.

Tennessee Titans

2013 season
On March 12, 2013, Walker signed a four-year $17.5 million contract with $8.6 million guaranteed with the Tennessee Titans.

In his Titans debut, Walker caught three passes for 40 yards as the Titans beat the Pittsburgh Steelers on the road by a score of 16-9. In the next game against the Houston Texans, he caught his first touchdown of the season on a 10-yard pass from Jake Locker as the Titans lost on the road in overtime by a score of 30-24. Two weeks later against the New York Jets, he recorded three receptions for 14 yards and a touchdown in the 38-13 victory. 

During a Week 7 31-17 loss to his former team, the San Francisco 49ers, Walker caught three passes for 52 yards and a touchdown.  Three weeks later against the Jacksonville Jaguars, he had four receptions for 62 yards and a touchdown in the narrow 29-27 loss.  In the next game against the Indianapolis Colts, Walker recorded 10 receptions for 91 yards and a touchdown as the Titans narrowly lost by a score of 30-27. During a Week 15 37-34 overtime loss to the Arizona Cardinals, he caught eight passes for 53 yards and a touchdown. 

Walker finished the 2013 season with 60 receptions for 571 yards and six touchdowns in 15 games and 11 starts.

2014 season
Walker began the season with three receptions for 37 yards and a touchdown in the season-opening 26-10 road victory over the Kansas City Chiefs.  In the next game against the Dallas Cowboys, he had a career day with ten receptions for 142 yards and a touchdown as the Titans lost by a score of 26-10. During a Week 12 43-24 road loss to the Philadelphia Eagles, Walker recorded five receptions for a career-high 155 yards. 

Walker finished the 2014 season with 63 receptions for 890 yards and four touchdowns in 15 games and 14 starts.

2015 season
Walker had a career year in 2015, shattering all Titans records for a tight end, including 1,088 yards receiving. He had previously broken the Titans' tight end receiving yards record in the 2014 season with 890 yards. Walker led all NFL tight ends with 94 receptions and became only the ninth tight end to ever record more than 90 catches in a single season. He was later named to his first career Pro Bowl.

Walker began the season with three receptions for 43 yards and a touchdown in the season-opening 42-14 road victory over the Tampa Bay Buccaneers. During a Week 9 34-28 overtime road victory over the New Orleans Saints, he recorded his first career multi-touchdown game with seven receptions for 95 yards and two touchdowns. Two weeks later against the Jacksonville Jaguars, Walker caught eight passes for 109 yards for his third career game with at least 100 yards as the Titans lost on the road by a score of 19-13. During a narrow Week 13 42-39 victory over the Jaguars, Walker had eight receptions for 92 yards and a touchdown. Two weeks later against the New England Patriots, Walker had a touchdown that would come off of a highlight-reel play in the fourth quarter. He caught a pass from quarterback Zach Mettenberger, broke two tackles, hurdled a man, and stiff-armed another, all while racing down the sideline to the end zone to complete a 57-yard score. Walker finished the 33-16 road loss with two catches for 64 yards and a pair of touchdowns. In the regular-season finale, he recorded nine receptions for 94 yards and a 36-yard rush in a 30-24 road loss to the Indianapolis Colts. Walker was ranked 82nd by his fellow players on the NFL Top 100 Players of 2016.

2016 season
On May 6, 2016, Walker signed a two-year contract extension worth $14.7 million with $8.2 million in guarantees.

Walker began the season catching five passes for 42 yards in the season-opening 25-16 loss to the Minnesota Vikings.  In the next game against the Detroit Lions, he had six receptions for 83 yards and his first touchdown of the season as the Titans narrowly won on the road by a score of 16-15. Three weeks later against the Miami Dolphins, Walker caught five passes for 66 yards and a touchdown in the 30-18 road victory. 

Walker began to hit his stride in the middle of the season. During a Week 7 34-26 loss to the Indianapolis Colts, he had seven receptions for 84 yards and a touchdown as the Titans lost by a score of 34-26. In the next game against the Jacksonville Jaguars, Walker recorded four receptions for 75 yards, including a season-long 47-yard reception in the third quarter as the Titans won by a score of 36-22. The following week against the San Diego Chargers, he caught five passes for 42 yards and a touchdown in the 43-35 road loss. During a Week 10 47-25 victory over the Green Bay Packers, Walker had nine receptions for 124 yards and a touchdown. Two weeks later against the Chicago Bears, he recorded three receptions for 50 yards and a touchdown in the 27-21 road victory.

Walker finished the 2016 season with 65 receptions for 800 yards and a career-high seven touchdowns in 15 games and 10 starts. He was named to his second consecutive Pro Bowl on December 20, 2016. Walker was ranked 75th by his fellow players on the NFL Top 100 Players of 2017.

2017 season
During a Week 2 37–16 road victory over the Jacksonville Jaguars, Walker recorded four receptions for 61 yards and his first rushing touchdown on a one-yard rush in the third quarter. During a Week 12 20-16 road victory over the Indianapolis Colts, Walker had four receptions for 63 yards and a touchdown. In the next game against the Houston Texans, he put up similar numbers, catching five passes for 63 yards and a touchdown as the Titans won by a score of 24-13. Two weeks later against his former team, the San Francisco 49ers, Walker recorded five passes for 39 yards and a touchdown in the narrow 25-23 road loss.

Walker finished the 2017 season with 74 receptions for 807 yards and three touchdowns to go along with a rushing touchdown in 16 games and 11 starts. The Titans finished with a 9-7 record and made the playoffs as a Wild Card team. During the Wild Card Round against the Kansas City Chiefs, Walker was the leading receiver, catching six passes for 74 yards. In the Divisional Round against the New England Patriots, he caught three passes for 49 yards including a 36 yard catch and run during the first quarter in the 35–14 road loss. On January 16, 2018, Walker was named to his third consecutive Pro Bowl to replace an injured Travis Kelce. Walker was named the 2018 Pro Bowl offensive MVP after catching the game-winning touchdown, in addition to another touchdown he caught earlier in the game. Walker was also ranked 72nd by his fellow players on the NFL Top 100 Players of 2018.

2018 season
On July 27, 2018, Walker signed a two-year contract extension with the Titans worth $17 million with $12.6 million in guarantees.

During the season-opener against the Miami Dolphins, Walker had four receptions for 52 yards before leaving the 27-20 road loss with an ankle injury in the fourth quarter.  It was later revealed that he suffered a dislocated ankle and an associated fracture and would miss the rest of the season. Walker was placed on injured reserve on September 10, 2018. Without Walker, the Titans finished 9–7 for the third consecutive year and missed out on the playoffs.

2019 season

Walker returned from his injury in time for the season-opener against the Cleveland Browns. In that game, he recorded five receptions for 55 yards and two touchdowns in the 43-13 road victory. During a Week 4 24-10 road victory over the Atlanta Falcons, Walker reached 500 career receptions.

On November 27, 2019, Walker was placed on injured reserve after dealing with an ankle injury for most of the season. Prior to his injury, Walker had 21 receptions for 215 yards and two touchdowns in seven games and four starts.  Without Walker, the Titans finished 9–7 for the fourth consecutive year and lost to the Kansas City Chiefs in the AFC Championship.

On March 13, 2020, Walker was released by the Titans after seven seasons.

Free agency
On December 9, 2020, Walker was on the Pat McAfee show and stated that he was staying in shape and could probably play that year, but with all the COVID-19 issues and with Dez Bryant being removed from warm-ups after testing positive and no one else was exposed despite photos of him with other players, Walker did not want to play in 2020.

On June 1, 2021, the San Francisco 49ers hosted Walker for a workout.

Retirement
On October 18, 2022, Walker announced his retirement from the NFL, signing a one-day deal with the Titans to retire as a member of the franchise.

NFL career statistics

Regular season

Postseason

NFL records

Titans franchise records
 Most receiving touchdowns by a tight end: 28
 Most receptions in a season by a tight end: 94
 Most receiving yards in a season by a tight end: 1,088

Personal life

In 2013, Walker's aunt and uncle were killed by a drunk driver five hours after Walker played in Super Bowl XLVII. The tragedy motivated him to speak out against drunk driving, and support laws requiring the installation of an ignition interlock device for first-time DUI offenders. Walker has three children and is a car and powerboat enthusiast.

References

External links

1984 births
Living people
Sportspeople from Pomona, California
Players of American football from California
African-American players of American football
American football wide receivers
American football tight ends
Mt. SAC Mounties football players
Central Missouri Mules football players
San Francisco 49ers players
Tennessee Titans players
Unconferenced Pro Bowl players
American Conference Pro Bowl players
21st-century African-American sportspeople
20th-century African-American people